Loxura atymnus, the yamfly, is a species of lycaenid or blue butterfly found in Asia.

Description

Eggs.  Dome shaped, whitish in colour. Diameter:  0.92  (±  0.09)  mm.

Caterpillar. 
Second instar: greenish yellow with two brownish dorsal bands  mid  dorsally. Anal plate with a prominent depression. The anterior end possessed a crescent shaped lip like  swelling  with  a  small  groove  on  the  head. Length  up to of  6.66  (±  0.34)  mm.
Third  instar:  similar  to  that  of  second  instar larvae  except  for  greater  size  reaching  a  length  of  9.7  (±  0.3)  mm
Fourth instar:  initially  similar  to  that  of  third  instar.  But  gradually  the  dorsal  bands  become darker  and  wider  up  to  19.62  (±  0.28)  mm

Pupae:
 pupae: attached  to  the  leaf  surface  via  its  cremaster  and  a  silk  girdle  to  the silk pad. Size 13.61 (± 0.27) mm with a relatively long abdominal portion. Greenish with mid dorsal brown and whiteband of cryptic patterns. After about 7 days the pupae become darker in colour indicating  their  approach  towards  maturity.  The  pupal  skin  became  transparent and the orange patches on the upperside of the forewings are visible through the transparent skin.

Subspecies
The subspecies of Loxura atymnus are:

 Loxura atymnus atymnus Stoll, 1780 – south India
 Loxura atymnus arcuata Moore, [1881] – Sri Lanka
 Loxura atymnus continentalis Fruhstorfer, 1912 – northeast India, Indochina 
 Loxura atymnus prabha Moore, 1877 – Andamans
 Loxura atymnus nicobarica Evans, 1932 – Nicobar Island
 Loxura atymnus fuconius Fruhstorfer, 1912 – Borneo, Thailand, peninsular Malaya, Langkawi, Singapore

Life history
Loxura atymnus  uses Smilax zeylanica  (Order:  Smilacaceae)  and  Dioscorea pentaphylla (Order: Dioscoreaceae) as host plant. Smilax  zeylanica is preferred for Oviposition and  eggs are laid singly  at  the  base  of  young  shoots. Before hatching parts of the egg shell are consumed. Just  after their emergence from the egg shells the hatchlings (1.23 ± 0.11 mm) consumed the  remaining  part  of  the  egg  shell, then they start feeding leaves. The first htree instars take 2–3 days. The fourth instar stops feeding after four days and attaches itself with a silk girdle and builds the pupal case. 15  to  16  days after hatching from eggs the pupation takes place. The adult butterflies emerged from the pupae after 7.7 (±0.27)  days.  The  total  life  cycles  were  completed  in  23–26  days in laboratory conditions and may be change with temperature changes. This short duration of life cycle enables the butterfly species to complete several life  cycles  within  a  year.

References

External links

Loxura
Butterflies of Asia
Butterflies of Singapore
Butterflies described in 1782